Olof Elis "Olle" Dickson (16 January 1901 – 6 June 1995) was a Swedish breaststroke swimmer who competed in the 1920 Summer Olympics. He was born in Gothenburg and died in Stockholm.

In 1920 he was eliminated in the semi-finals of the 200 metre breaststroke competition as well as in the semi-finals of the 400 metre breaststroke event.

References

External links
profile

1901 births
1995 deaths
Olympic swimmers of Sweden
Swimmers at the 1920 Summer Olympics
Swedish people of Scottish descent
Swedish male breaststroke swimmers